A Postcognitive Negation: The Sadomasochistic Dialectic of American Psychology is a book written by Matthew Giobbi. It was published in 2010 by Atropos Press in New York City. The text was edited by Wolfgang Schirmacher.

References

External links
 Atropos Press, NYC/Dresden

2010 non-fiction books
Philosophy books
Psychology books